The 45th Telluride Film Festival took place from August 31 to September 3, 2018 in Telluride, Colorado, United States. 

Novelist Jonathan Lethem was selected as the guest director of the event. As the guest director, Lethem served as a key collaborator in the festival programming decisions. Telluride honored Alfonso Cuarón, Emma Stone, and Rithy Panh as the Silver Medallion winners.

Official selections

Main programme

Guest Director's Selections
The films were selected and presented by the year's guest director, Jonathan Lethem.

Backlot
The films were selected and presented by Jeffrey Keil and Danielle Pinet. The selection included behind-the-scene movies and portraits of artists, musicians, and filmmakers.

Filmmakers of Tomorrow

Student Prints
The selection was curated and introduced by Gregory Nava. It selected the best student-produced work around the world.

Calling Cards
The selection was curated by Barry Jenkins and presented by Nick O'Neill. It selected new works from promising filmmakers.

Great Expectations
The selection was curated by Barry Jenkins and presented by Nick O'Neill.

Introducing Saba Riazi
The section was intended to highlight the work by Iranian writer and director, Saba Riazi.

Silver Medallion
Alfonso Cuarón
Emma Stone
Rithy Panh

Special Medallion
Dieter Kosslick

References

2018 film festivals
2018 festivals in the United States
45th